The African brown water snake (Afronatrix anoscopus) is a snake in the family Colubridae . 

It is found in Africa.

References 

Natricinae
Reptiles of Africa
Reptiles described in 1861
Taxa named by Edward Drinker Cope